Dany Maury (born 18 August 1994) is a Cameroonian professional footballer who plays as a centre-back for Trélissac FC.

Club career
Maury made his Ligue 1 debut for Toulouse on 11 February 2014 in a 1–3 home defeat against SC Bastia playing the first 50 minutes, before being substituted for Ilias Hassani.

References

External links
 

1994 births
Living people
Association football defenders
Cameroonian footballers
Toulouse FC players
Trélissac FC players
Championnat National 3 players
Ligue 1 players
Championnat National 2 players
Cameroonian expatriate footballers
Cameroonian expatriate sportspeople in France
Expatriate footballers in France